Philibert Rebillé dit Philbert (also Philibert, 1639 – after March 1717) was a French flautist.

He is credited with the introduction of the one-keyed flute to France in around 1667. He was made a court musician by Louis XIV of France under the title of Musette de Poitou.

His wife was involved in the Affair of the Poisons and was executed in 1679 for having poisoned her first husband, M. Brunet, in order to marry Philbert.

References
 Jonathan Wainwright, Peter Holman - From Renaissance to Baroque: change in instruments and instrumental music in the seventeenth century (Ashgate Publishing, Ltd (2005) )
 Anne Somerset - The Affair of the Poisons: Murder, Infanticide, and Satanism at the Court of Louis XIV (St. Martin's Press (October 12, 2003) )

Notes

1639 births
1717 deaths
French classical flautists
Affair of the Poisons